A butler is a domestic worker, generally in a large household and usually the senior male servant.

Butler or Butlers may also refer to:

People and fictional characters
 Butler (surname), including a list of people and fictional characters
 Butler (given name), a list of people
 Buttlar (noble family), also spelled Butler, an old German noble family
 Butler dynasty, a noble family prominent for several centuries in Ireland

Places

Antarctica 
 Butler Glacier
 Butler Island (Antarctica)
 Butler Nunataks
 Butler Passage
 Butler Peaks
 Butler Rocks
 Butler Summit

Australia
 Butler, South Australia
 Butler, Western Australia, a suburb of Perth

Canada 
 Butler, Manitoba
 Butler Range (Canada), a mountain range in British Columbia

New Zealand 
 Butler Range (Canterbury), South Island
 Butler Range (West Coast), South Island
 Butler River

United States 
 Butler, Alabama, a town
 New Kingman-Butler, Arizona, an unincorporated community and census-designated place commonly called Butler
 Butler, Georgia, a city
 Butler, Illinois, a village
 Butler, Indiana, a city
 Butler, Kentucky, a home rule-class city
 Butler, Maryland, an unincorporated community
 Butler, Missouri, a city
 Butler, New Jersey, a borough
 Butler, New York, a town
 Butler, Ohio, a village
 Butler, Oklahoma, a town in Custer County
 Butler, Delaware County, Oklahoma, a census-designated place
 Butler, Pennsylvania, a city
 Butler, South Dakota, a town
 Butler, Tennessee, an unincorporated community
 Butler, Bastrop County, Texas, an unincorporated community
 Butler, Freestone County, Texas, an unincorporated community
 Butler, Clark County, Wisconsin, a town
 Butler, Waukesha County, Wisconsin, a village
 Atwood, Nevada, also known as Butler, Nevada
 Butler Brook, New York
 Butler Canyon, Arizona
 Butler County (disambiguation)
 Butler Creek (disambiguation)
 Butler Farm, Swedesboro, New Jersey, on the National Register of Historic Places
 Butler Reservoir, New Jersey
 Butler Township (disambiguation)
 Butler Valley (Arizona)
 Camp Butler, original name of Camp Misery, an American Civil War Union Army camp
 Fort Butler (disambiguation)
 Lake Butler (disambiguation)

Outer space 
 13543 Butler, an asteroid

Companies
 Butler Air Transport, a defunct Australian company
 Butler Hotel, Seattle, Washington
 Butler International, a defunct engineering services firm based in Fort Lauderdale, Florida
 Butlers (company) (BUTLERS GmbH & Co KG), a German retail chain
 Butlers Chocolates, an Irish-owned manufacturer of luxury chocolate and chocolate products

Films
 The Butler (1913 film), an American film produced by the Foster Photoplay Company
 The Butler (1916 film), an American comedy
 The Butler, a 2013 American film

Schools
 Butler University, a liberal arts university in Indianapolis, Indiana
 Butler College, one of the six residential colleges of Princeton University
 Butler College (Texas), a former coeducational black school in Tyler, Texas
 Butler Community College, El Dorado, Kansas
 Butler College (Perth), a public high school in Perth, Australia
 Butler High School (disambiguation)
 Butler Elementary School (disambiguation)
 Butler School (disambiguation)

Sports
 Butler Bucks, a minor league baseball team based in Butler, Pennsylvania, from 1905 until 1908
 Butler Bulldogs, the sports teams of Butler University, Indianapolis, Indiana
 Butler Grizzlies, the sports teams of Butler Community College, El Dorado, Kansas
 Butler Tigers, a baseball team based in Butler, Pennsylvania, from 1935 to 1951
 Butler (basketball), a 1906–07 Central Basketball League team in Butler, Ohio
 Butler National Golf Club, a private golf club in Oak Brook, Illinois

Titles
 Baron Butler, a title created twice, once in the Peerage of Ireland and once in the Peerage of England
 Butler baronets, two baronetcies in the Baronetage of Ireland and two in the Baronetage of the United Kingdom

Transportation
 Butler railway station, in Perth, Western Australia, Australia
 Butler station (MBTA), in Boston, Massachusetts, United States
 Butler station (New Jersey), in Morris County, New Jersey, United States
 Butler Blackhawk, a 1928 American biplane
 Butler Petro Cycle, considered by many to be the first British car

Other uses
 , a World War II US Navy destroyer
 Butler Medal, a military decoration of the United States Army issued in 1865 to African Americans
 Butler (software), automating application for Mac OS X
 Butler Act, a 1925 Tennessee law prohibiting public school teachers from denying the Biblical account of man's origin
 Butler Block, a building in Uxbridge, Massachusetts
 Butler group, in mathematics
 Butler Hospital, Providence, Rhode Island
 Butler Institute of American Art, Youngstown, Ohio, a museum
 Butler Library, Columbia University
 Butler matrix, a beamforming network used to feed a phased array of antenna elements
 Butler oscillator
 Butler Review, a 2004 British report about the intelligence on Iraq's weapons of mass destruction
 Butlers: Chitose Momotose Monogatari, a Japanese anime television series

See also
 Pagan the Butler (died c. 1149), lord of Oultrejordain in the Kingdom of Jerusalem
 Lucan the Butler, in Arthurian legend King Arthur's servant
 Battler (disambiguation)
 Butler House (disambiguation), various buildings